Amica is an opera in two acts by Pietro Mascagni, originally composed to a libretto by Paul Bérel (the pseudonym of Paul de Choudens). The only opera by Mascagni with a French libretto, it was an immediate success with both the audience and the critics on its opening night at the Théâtre du Casino in Monte-Carlo on 16 March 1905. Mascagni himself conducted the performance. The opera had its Italian premiere (with an Italian libretto by Mascagni's close collaborator, Giovanni Targioni-Tozzetti) on 13 May 1905 at the Teatro Costanzi in Rome.

However, like many of Mascagni's operas apart from Cavalleria rusticana, the work then fell into obscurity. The First modern recording was on 1995 for kikko classic with Katia Ricciarelli conducted  by Marco Pace. One of its few revivals in modern times was on 4 August 2007 at the Festival della Valle d'Itria, using the original French libretto. (It has been released on CD and DVD.)

Set in the mountains of Savoy around 1900, Amica is a classic verismo drama. It recounts a domestic tragedy involving two brothers (Giorgio and Renaldo) and the woman they both love (Amica).

Roles

Recordings
In Italian: Katia Ricciarelli, Fabio Armiliato, Walter Donati, Elia Padovan, Hungarian Radio and Television Symphony Orchestra & Chorus. Conductor: Marco Pace. Released 1996. Kicco Classic 00296
In the original French: Anna Malavasi, David Sotgiu, Pierluigi Dilengite, Marcello Rosiello, Francesca De Giorgi, Festival della Valle d'Itria, Orchestra Internazionale d'Italia, Bratislava Chamber Choir. Conductor: Manlio Benzi. Digital live recording. Released 2008. CD version: Dynamic CDS 574. DVD version: Dynamic, distributed by Naxos, filmed at the Palazzo Ducale, Martina Franca, Italy, 4–6 August 2007.

References

Further reading
Jellinek, George, Recording review, Opera News, November 1996
Mallach, Alan, Pietro Mascagni and His Operas, Northeastern University Press, 2002, pp. 165–169.

External links

Libretto in Italian, Mascagni.org
, Festival della Valle d'Itria, 2007
Background, synopsis, Roger Witts, 2011, operastory.co.uk

Verismo operas
Operas
Operas by Pietro Mascagni
Opera world premieres at the Opéra de Monte-Carlo
1905 operas
French-language operas
Italian-language operas